Comfort station may refer to:
a euphemism for public toilet 
a euphemism for rest area
Comfort Station No. 68, a public toilet in Oregon
Comfort Station No. 72, a public toilet in Oregon
Comfort Station, a public toilet in Milton, Massachusetts
 a brothel used in the context of comfort women serving the Japanese military 1931–1945

Restrooms in the United States